George Nicholson may refer to:

George Nicholson (diplomat) (floruit 1577–1603), English agent in Scotland
George Nicholson (printer) (1760–1825), English printer
George Nicholson (footballer) (1905–?), English professional footballer
George Nicholson (horticulturist) (1847–1908), English horticulturist
George Nicholson (rugby union) (1878–1968), New Zealand rugby union player see The Original All Blacks
George Nicholson (politician) (1868–1935), Canadian Member of Parliament
George Nicholson (sailor) (born 1937), British Olympic sailor
George E. Nicholson Jr. (1918–1971), American mathematician
George M. Nicholson (1874–?), justice of the Oklahoma Supreme Court
George Gibb Nicholson (1875–1948), English-born Australian philologist and professor of French